Madame X or Portrait of Madame X is a portrait painting by John Singer Sargent of a young socialite, Virginie Amélie Avegno Gautreau, wife of the French banker Pierre Gautreau. Madame X was painted not as a commission, but at the request of Sargent. It is a study in opposition. Sargent shows a woman posing in a black satin dress with jeweled straps, a dress that reveals and hides at the same time. The portrait is characterized by the pale flesh tone of the subject contrasted against a dark-colored dress and background.

The scandal resulting from the painting's controversial reception at the Paris Salon of 1884 amounted to a temporary set-back to Sargent while in France, though it may have helped him later establish a successful career in Britain and America.

Background
The model was an American expatriate who married a French banker, and became notorious in Parisian high society for her beauty and rumored infidelities. She wore lavender powder and prided herself on her appearance. She was referred to as a "professional beauty" – an English-language term for a woman who uses personal skills to advance herself socially. Her unconventional beauty made her an object of fascination for artists; the American painter Edward Simmons claimed that he "could not stop stalking her as one does a deer." Sargent was also impressed, and anticipated that a portrait of Gautreau would garner much attention at the upcoming Paris Salon, and increase interest in portrait commissions. He wrote to a friend:
"I have a great desire to paint her portrait and have reason to think she would allow it and is waiting for someone to propose this homage to her beauty. If you are 'bien avec elle' and will see her in Paris, you might tell her I am a man of prodigious talent."

Although she had refused numerous similar requests from artists, Gautreau accepted Sargent's offer in February 1883. Sargent was an expatriate like Gautreau, and their collaboration has been interpreted as motivated by a shared desire to attain high status in French society.

Studies

Little progress was made during the winter of 1883, as Gautreau was distracted by social engagements, and was not by nature inclined to the discipline of sitting for a portrait. At her suggestion, Sargent traveled to her estate in Brittany in June, where he commenced a series of preparatory works in pencil, watercolors, and oils. About thirty drawings resulted from these sessions, in which many poses were attempted. Like the eventual portrait, an oil sketch entitled Madame Gautreau Drinking a Toast (Isabella Stewart Gardner Museum), shows the subject's profile and bare arms against a dark background, but is of a more freely brushed and informal character.

Just as she had been in Paris, in the country Gautreau was bored by the process of sitting; here, too, there were social engagements, as well as the responsibilities of tending to her four-year-old daughter, her mother, house guests, and a full domestic staff. Sargent complained of "the unpaintable beauty and hopeless laziness of Madame Gautreau."

Execution
As in his previous entries to the Salon, The Daughters of Edward Darley Boit and El Jaleo, Sargent chose a canvas of dimensions large enough to ensure notice on the crowded Salon walls. The pose proved to be different from any of those tried in the preliminary works. It necessitated that Gautreau stand with her body facing the artist while her head was turned away, her right arm extended behind her for support, her hand on a low table; the result was to create tension in the neck and arm as well as to emphasize the subject's elegant contours. For painting the artificial tone of Gautreau's pale skin, Sargent used a palette composed of lead white, rose madder, vermilion, viridian, and bone black.

Even when composition had been decided upon and painting started, work progressed slowly. In a letter to a friend Sargent wrote "One day I was dissatisfied with it and dashed a tone of light rose over the former gloomy background... The élancée [tall and slender] figure of the model shows to much greater advantage." On September 7, Sargent wrote "still at Paramé, basking in the sunshine of my beautiful model's countenance." By the fall, Sargent's interest in the venture was nearing completion: "The summer is definitely over and with it, I admit, is my pleasure at being at Les Chênes [Gautreau's estate]."

Description

There is an assertion and showiness in the expanse of white skin – from her high forehead down her graceful neck, shoulders, and arms. Although the black of her dress is bold, it is also deep, recessive and mysterious. She is surrounded by a rich brown which is at once luminous and dark enough to provide contrast to the skin tones. Most disconcerting is the whiteness of the skin, an overt contrivance of "aristocratic pallor"; by contrast her red ear is a jarring reminder of the color of flesh unadorned.

Sargent chose the pose for Gautreau carefully: her body boldly faces forward while her head is turned in profile. A profile is both assertion and retreat; half of the face is hidden while, at the same time, the part that shows can seem more defined than full face.

The table provides support for Gautreau, and echoes her curves and stance. At the time, her pose was considered sexually suggestive. As originally exhibited, one strap of her gown had fallen down Gautreau's right shoulder, suggesting the possibility of further revelation; "One more struggle", wrote a critic in Le Figaro, "and the lady will be free". (Perhaps unknown to the critic, the bodice was constructed over a metal and whalebone foundation and could not have fallen; the shoulder straps were ornamental).

The image's erotic suggestion is of a distinctly upper-class sort: unnaturally pale skin, cinched waist, severity of profile and an emphasis on aristocratic bone structure all imply a distant sexuality "under the professional control of the sitter", rather than offered for the viewer's delectation.

Classical sources, such as the figures in a fresco by Francesco de' Rossi, have been suggested as inspiration for the pose. The painting features several subtle classical references: sirens of Greek mythology adorn the table's legs, and the crescent tiara worn by Gautreau symbolizes the goddess Diana. The latter was not contrived by the artist, but was part of Gautreau's self-display.

Reception
While the work was in progress, Gautreau was enthusiastic; she believed that Sargent was painting a masterpiece. When the painting first appeared at the Paris Salon under the title Portrait de Mme *** in 1884, people were shocked and scandalized; the attempt to preserve the subject's anonymity was unsuccessful, and the sitter's mother requested that Sargent withdraw the painting from the exhibition. Sargent refused, saying he had painted her "exactly as she was dressed, that nothing could be said of the canvas worse than had been said in print of her appearance". Later, Sargent overpainted the shoulder strap to raise it up and make it look more securely fastened. He also changed the title, from the original Portrait de Mme ***, to Madame X – a name more assertive, dramatic and mysterious, and, by accenting the impersonal, giving the illusion of the woman archetype.

The poor public and critical reception was a disappointment to both artist and model. Gautreau was humiliated by the affair, and Sargent soon left Paris and moved to London permanently.

Aftermath
Sargent hung Madame X first in his Paris studio, and later in his studio in London. Starting in 1905, he displayed it in a number of international exhibitions. In 1916, Sargent sold the painting to the Metropolitan Museum of Art, writing to its director "I suppose it is the best thing I have ever done." A second, unfinished version of the same pose, in which the position of the right shoulder strap remained unresolved, is in the Tate, London.

Seven years after Sargent painted Madame Gautreau, Gustave Courtois painted her. As in the earlier painting, the portrait shows her face in profile. She wears the same style of dress, with Courtois's portrait showing a bit more skin. The strap of her dress hangs off her shoulder much as it had in Sargent's portrait. This time, however, the portrait was well received by the public. In 1897 Gautreau posed yet again for a standing portrait, for what would be her favorite version, by Antonio de La Gándara.

In 1960, Cuban-American fashion designer Luis Estévez created an iconic black dress based on the John Singer Sargent painting Portrait of Madame X (1884). Dina Merrill modeled the Estévez dress for photographer Milton H. Greene published in Life magazine on 11 January 1960.

Gallery

References

Further reading

Strapless: John Singer Sargent and the Fall of Madame X, Paperback – May 3, 2004; by Deborah Davis (Author).

External links
Madame X Analysis & Critical Reception
Madame X at The Metropolitan Museum of Art
Madame X image and essay about the painting.
Essay: Sargent's 'Madame X'; or, Assertion and Retreat in Woman.
Gustave Courtois' Madame Gauthereau.
The United States of America, a catalog from The Metropolitan Museum of Art Libraries (fully available online as PDF), which contains material on this painting (p. 86–87)
Portrait of Madame X in original frame

1884 paintings
Madame X
Paintings by John Singer Sargent
Paintings in the collection of the Metropolitan Museum of Art
Madame X